Il Ballo del Doge ("The Doge’s Ball") is a Venetian masquerade ball, one of the many events held annually during the Carnival of Venice. The ball itself is held in the 15th-century Venetian palace of Palazzo Pisani Moretta, situated on the Grand Canal in Venice. The ball's name derives from the title of the elected heads (Doge, "Duke" in English) who ruled Venice up until the fall of the Venetian republic in the 18th century.  Every year the ball is attended by around four hundred guests dressed in period costume and masked.  

The event is a reconstruction of an 18th-century masquerade ball and includes a meal of Venetian cuisine. Over the years the entertainment has included performances by opera singers, musicians, burlesque artists and characters from the Commedia dell'Arte.

History
Il Ballo del Doge was born in Venice in 1994, and takes place every year in Venice during the Carnival. Every edition of Il Ballo has a different theme that takes inspiration from the childlike dreams of her inventor, Antonia Sautter, fashion designer and luxury events manager in Venice and worldwide. 
The Press, the Media and the Guests that have succeeded one another throughout the years defined it as the most sumptuous, refined and exclusive masquerade event in the world, and one of the one-hundred things everyone should do at least once in their lifetime. 
Il Ballo del Doge has been described by Vanity Fair as "one of the most exclusive parties in the world." Guests have included members of European, Middle Eastern and Asian royal families, celebrities, and leaders in international business and finance.

About Il Ballo del Doge
Il Ballo del Doge was born in Venice in 1994, and takes place every year in Venice during the Carnival. Every edition of Il Ballo has a different theme that takes inspiration from the childlike dreams of her inventor, Antonia Sautter, fashion designer and luxury events manager in Venice and worldwide. 
The iconic Palazzo Pisani Moretta is the renowned location that, overlooking the Grand Canal, hosts the event that has reached its XXV edition. 
The Press, the Media and the Guests that have succeeded one another throughout the years defined it as the most sumptuous, refined and exclusive masquerade event in the world, and one of the one-hundred things everyone should do at least once in their lifetime. 
Throughout the years, Il Ballo del Doge, the most famous signature event by Antonia Sautter, has become an extraordinary production that goes beyond the simple party and a true international happening, celebrated by jet setters, celebrities and all dream seekers, thanks to the great consensus gained edition after edition. 
The Guests, wearing the costumes designed and hand-made by Antonia Sautter in her Atelier, which hosts over 1.500 creations she has realised over the years, reach the Palace by water, thus immediately immerging themselves in a  fantastic world made of luxurious decorations, set designs created specifically for every edition’s theme, seamless artistic spectacles with over a hundred performers, refined cuisine and drinks, music, dances and itinerary entertainment until late in the night. 

Il Ballo del Doge celebrated his twenty-fifth edition on Saturday, February 10th, 2018 and, for the occasion, the event had even more resonance than ever. The edition has been titled “Rebirth & Celebration” the set designs, the shows, the menu and every moment of the event were dedicated to the theme of the constant renewal of rebirth and the celebration of emotions, creativity and passion.

Il Ballo del Doge is covered by the international press: TV programmes, newspapers and magazines from all over the world follow the event every year.

See also
Venetian Festival

Press release

Vogue Italia, February 2018
Vanity Fair, February 2018
VDG Magazine, February 2018
Le Vin Parfait, February 2018
Excellence Magazine, January 2018

External links
Il Ballo del Doge, official website
Il Ballo del Doge 2010, official video

Festivals in Venice
Masquerade balls